In mathematics, the square lattice is a type of lattice in a two-dimensional Euclidean space.

Two orientations of an image of the lattice are by far the most common. They can conveniently be referred to as the upright square lattice and diagonal square lattice; the latter is also called the centered square lattice. They differ by an angle of 45°. This is related to the fact that a square lattice can be partitioned into two square sub-lattices, as is evident in the colouring of a checkerboard.

Symmetry
The square lattice's symmetry category is wallpaper group . A pattern with this lattice of translational symmetry cannot have more, but may have less symmetry than the lattice itself.
An upright square lattice can be viewed as a diagonal square lattice with a mesh size that is √2 times as large, with the centers of the squares added. Correspondingly, after adding the centers of the squares of an upright square lattice one obtains a diagonal square lattice with a mesh size that is √2 times as small as that of the original lattice.
A pattern with 4-fold rotational symmetry has a square lattice of 4-fold rotocenters that is a factor √2 finer and diagonally oriented relative to the lattice of translational symmetry.

With respect to reflection axes there are three possibilities:
None. This is wallpaper group .
In four directions. This is wallpaper group .
In two perpendicular directions. This is wallpaper group . The points of intersection of the reflexion axes form a square grid which is as fine as, and oriented the same as, the square lattice of 4-fold rotocenters, with these rotocenters at the centers of the squares formed by the reflection axes.

Crystal classes 
The square lattice class names, Schönflies notation, Hermann-Mauguin notation, orbifold notation, Coxeter notation, and wallpaper groups are listed in the table below.

See also
Centered square number
 Euclid's orchard
Gaussian integer
Hexagonal lattice
Quincunx
Square tiling

References

Euclidean geometry
Lattice points
Crystal systems